The Sapão River is a river of Bahia state in eastern Brazil.

The Sapão is a tributary of the Preto River of Bahia.

The river basin includes part of the  Serra Geral do Tocantins Ecological Station, a strictly protected conservation unit created in 2001 to preserve an area of cerrado.

See also
List of rivers of Bahia

References

Brazilian Ministry of Transport

Rivers of Bahia